"Sledgehammer" is a song by English rock musician Peter Gabriel. It was released on 21 April 1986 as the lead single from his fifth studio album, So (1986). It was produced by Gabriel and Daniel Lanois. It reached No. 1 in Canada on 21 July 1986, where it spent four weeks; No. 1 on the Billboard Hot 100 chart in the United States on 26 July 1986; and No. 4 on the UK Singles Chart, thanks in part to its music video. It was his biggest hit in North America and ties with "Games Without Frontiers" as his biggest hit in the United Kingdom.

The song's video won a record nine MTV Video Music Awards at the 1987 MTV Video Music Awards and Best British Video at the 1987 Brit Awards. The song also saw Gabriel nominated for three Grammy Award for Best Male Rock Vocal Performance, Record of the Year and Song of the Year. In a 2005 poll conducted by Channel 4 the music video was ranked second on their list of the 100 Greatest Pop Videos.

Background and release
"Sledgehammer" has been described as dance-rock, funk rock and soul. Ryan Reed of Paste called the song a danceable "blue-eyed soul-strut". Trouser Press gave it as an example of Gabriel's "characteristically sophisticated music" which in this case "touches on funk".

The song also features a synthesised shakuhachi flute generated with an E-mu Emulator II sampler. Gabriel said the "cheap organ sound" comes from an expensive Prophet-5 synth, which he regards as "an old warhorse" sound tool. The backing vocals were by P. P. Arnold, Coral "Chyna Whyne" Gordon, and Dee Lewis, who also did the backing for "Big Time".

"Sledgehammer" is Gabriel's only US No. 1. It replaced "Invisible Touch" by his former band Genesis; coincidentally, that group's only US No. 1.  Genesis lead singer Phil Collins later jested about the occurrence in a 2014 interview, stating, "I read recently that Peter Gabriel knocked us off the No. 1 spot with 'Sledgehammer'. We weren't aware of that at the time. If we had been, we'd probably have sent him a telegram saying: 'Congratulations – bastard.'"

"Sledgehammer" also achieved success on other Billboard charts in 1986, spanning the Album Rock Tracks (two weeks at the summit in May and June) and Hot Dance Club Play (one week atop this chart in July). 

The single release included the previously unreleased "Don't Break This Rhythm" and an "'85 Remix" of 1982's "I Have the Touch". US versions of the single contained an extended dance remix of "Sledgehammer".

Music video
The "Sledgehammer" music video was commissioned by Tessa Watts at Virgin Records, directed by Stephen R. Johnson and produced by Adam Whittaker. Aardman Animations and the Brothers Quay provided claymation, pixilation, and stop motion animation that gave life to images in the song. Many of these techniques had been employed in earlier music videos, such as Talking Heads's 1985 hit "Road to Nowhere", also directed by Johnson. The style was later used in the video for "Big Time", another single from So.

Gabriel lay under a sheet of glass for 16 hours while filming the video one frame at a time. "It took a lot of hard work," Gabriel recalled. "I was thinking at the time, 'If anyone wants to try and copy this video, good luck to them.'" Two dead, headless, featherless chickens were animated using stop-motion and shown dancing along to the synthesised shakuhachi solo. This section was animated by Nick Park, of Aardman Animations, who was refining his work in plasticine animation at the time. The video ended with a large group of extras jerkily rotating around Gabriel, among them his daughters Anna-Marie and Melanie, the animators themselves and director Stephen Johnson's girlfriend. Also included were six women who posed as the back-up singers of the song.

"Sledgehammer" won nine MTV Video Music Awards in 1987, the most awards a single video has won. It ranked at number four on MTV's 100 Greatest Music Videos Ever Made (1999). "Sledgehammer" has also been declared MTV's number one animated video of all time. The video was voted number seven on TMF's Ultimate 50 Videos You Must See, which first aired 24 June 2006. It ranked at number 2 on VH1's "Top 20 Videos of the '80s" and number one on "Amazing Moment in Music" on the Australian TV show 20 to 1 in 2007. It won Best British Video at the 1987 Brit Awards and was nominated for the Best Music Video category for the first annual Soul Train Music Awards in that same year.

The music video was remastered into 4K resolution, and was released in 2018 through Apple Music.

Accolades

|-
|rowspan="16"|1987
|rowspan="2"|Brit Awards
|British Single of the Year
|
|-
|British Video of the Year
|
|-
|rowspan="3"|Grammy Award
|Record of the Year
|
|-
|Song of the Year
|
|-
|Best Male Rock Vocal Performance
|
|-
|rowspan="10"|MTV Video Music Award
|Video of the Year
|
|-
|Best Male Video
|
|-
|Best Concept Video
|
|-
|Most Experimental Video
|
|-
|Best Overall Performance
|
|-
|Best Direction
|
|-
|Best Visual Effects
|
|-
|Best Art Direction
|
|-
|Best Editing
|
|-
|Viewer's Choice Award
|
|-
|Soul Train Music Awards
|Best Video of the Year
|
|}

Personnel
Credits adapted from the liner notes of So.

Peter Gabriel – vocals, CMI, piano, Prophet
Manu Katché – drums
Tony Levin – bass
David Rhodes – guitar
Daniel Lanois – guitar, tambourine
Wayne Jackson – trumpet
Mark Rivera – saxophone
Don Mikkelsen – trombone
P. P. Arnold, Coral Gordon, Dee Lewis – backing vocals

Charts

Weekly charts

Year-end charts

Certifications

Covers and parodies
In 1986, "Weird Al" Yankovic covered this song as the first song from his polka medley "Polka Party!" from the 1986 album of the same name.

On 2nd of March 2020 Harry Styles covered this song for the first time publicly on the Howard Stern Show.

See also
List of Billboard Hot 100 number-one singles of 1986
List of Billboard Mainstream Rock number-one songs of the 1980s
List of Cash Box Top 100 number-one singles of 1986
List of number-one singles of 1986 (Canada)
List of number-one dance singles of 1985 (U.S.)

References

External links

"Episode 8: Music Videos", Aardman.com. Retrieved 19 October 2013.

1986 singles
1986 songs
Billboard Hot 100 number-one singles
British soul songs
Cashbox number-one singles
Charisma Records singles
Dance-rock songs
Funk rock songs
Geffen Records singles
Peter Gabriel songs
RPM Top Singles number-one singles
Song recordings produced by Daniel Lanois
Songs written by Peter Gabriel